The Augustin musket was an Austrian musket used in the mid 19th century. It was used in several European wars, and also featured in the U.S. Civil War.

History
The Augustin Infantry Musket was an Austrian musket that was manufactured from 1842 to the early 1850s. The model was a smoothbore and used percussion caps. The weapon was primarily used during the Revolutions of 1848 mainly in the Austrian Empire, as well as the Italian Wars of Independence with minor use in the American Civil War and Mexican forces during the French Intervention in Mexico with the weapon being rebored into a rifle instead of smoothbore.

See also 
 Weapons of the Austro-Hungarian Empire

References

American Civil War rifles
Rifles of Austria
Rifled muskets
Weapons and ammunition introduced in 1842